The Convention on Transit Trade of Land-locked States is a multilateral treaty that addresses international rules allowing for land-locked countries to transport goods to and from seaports. The convention imposes obligations on both land-locked states and on coastal states that ratify the treaty.

The convention was concluded at the United Nations Conference on Transit Trade of Land-locked Countries, which had been established by the United Nations General Assembly. It was concluded and signed on 8 July 1965. The treaty came into force on 9 June 1967.

Coastal states that ratify the convention (known as "transit states") agree to make arrangements with land-locked states that are party to the treaty that wish to transit goods across the territory of the transit state to or from a coastal port in the transit state. The transit states agree that they will not discriminate based on place of origin or destination of the goods being transported. The land-locked states agree to be responsible for any expenses that the transit states incur in supervising or protecting the transit of the land-locked state's goods.

The convention has been noted as the first international agreement to recognise the special disadvantaged position of land-locked states.

As of June 2014, the treaty has been ratified by 43 states, made up of an approximately even split of land-locked and coastal states. The convention has essentially been superseded by the United Nations Convention on the Law of the Sea, which contains similar provisions for transit arrangements to be made between coastal and land-locked states.

Notes

References
Kishor Uprety, The Transit Regime for Landlocked States: International Law and Development Perspectives (Washington DC: The World Bank, 2006) pp. 66–75.

External links
Text
Signatures and ratifications.

Treaties concluded in 1965
Treaties entered into force in 1967
United Nations treaties
Transport treaties
Law of the sea treaties
Convention
Treaties of Armenia
Treaties of Australia
Treaties of the Byelorussian Soviet Socialist Republic
Treaties of Belgium
Treaties of Burkina Faso
Treaties of Burundi
Treaties of the Central African Republic
Treaties of Chad
Treaties of Chile
Treaties of the Republic of the Congo
Treaties of Croatia
Treaties of Czechoslovakia
Treaties of the Czech Republic
Treaties of Denmark
Treaties of Finland
Treaties of Georgia (country)
Treaties of the Hungarian People's Republic
Treaties of Kazakhstan
Treaties of the Kingdom of Laos
Treaties of Lesotho
Treaties of Mali
Treaties of Malawi
Treaties of the Mongolian People's Republic
Treaties of Montenegro
Treaties of Nepal
Treaties of the Netherlands
Treaties of Niger
Treaties of Nigeria
Treaties of Norway
Treaties of the Soviet Union
Treaties of Rwanda
Treaties of San Marino
Treaties of Senegal
Treaties of Serbia and Montenegro
Treaties of Slovakia
Treaties of Spain
Treaties of Eswatini
Treaties of Sweden
Treaties of Tajikistan
Treaties of Turkey
Treaties of the Ukrainian Soviet Socialist Republic
Treaties of the United States
Treaties of Uzbekistan
Treaties of Yugoslavia
Treaties of Zambia
1965 in New York City
Treaties extended to the Netherlands Antilles
Treaties extended to Aruba
Treaties extended to Greenland
Treaties extended to the Faroe Islands
1965 in transport